Werner Zwingli (born 6 January 1927) was a Swiss cross-country skier. He competed in the men's 15 kilometre event at the 1956 Winter Olympics.

References

External links

1927 births
Possibly living people
Swiss male cross-country skiers
Olympic cross-country skiers of Switzerland
Cross-country skiers at the 1956 Winter Olympics
Place of birth missing (living people)